Trinity Hall is a private school in the Catholic tradition for girls in ninth through twelfth grades, located in Tinton Falls, in Monmouth County, New Jersey, United States.

The school has been accredited by the Middle States Association of Colleges and Schools Commission on Elementary and Secondary Schools since 2016 and its accreditation expires in December 2026. The school is a member of the New Jersey Association of Independent Schools, the National Association of Independent Schools and the National Coalition of Girls' Schools.

As of the 2017–18 school year, the school had an enrollment of 201 students and 35.5 classroom teachers (on an FTE basis), for a student–teacher ratio of 5.7:1. The school's student body was 87.6% (176) White, 7.5% (15) Hispanic, 2.5% (5) Black and 2.5% (5) two or more races.

Athletics
The Trinity Hall Monarchs compete in Division B Central of the Shore Conference, an athletic conference comprised of public and private high schools in Monmouth and Ocean counties along the Jersey Shore. The conference operates under the supervision of the New Jersey State Interscholastic Athletic Association/ With 320 students in grades 10-12, the school was classified by the NJSIAA for the 2019–20 school year as Non-Public B for most athletic competition purposes, which included schools with an enrollment of 37 to 366 students in that grade range (equivalent to Group I for public schools). Sports offered include basketball, cross country, golf, lacrosse, soccer, softball, swimming, tennis, track and field (spring and winter) and volleyball.

The school was the winner of the 2019-20 Shop Rite Cup for Non-Public B, which recognizes athletic achievement across all interscholastic sports.

The swimming team won the Non-Public B state championship in 2016-2020. The program's five state titles are tied for ninth-most in the state. The 2017 won the Non-Public B state title, defeating Villa Walsh Academy 118-52 in the tournament finals. The 2020 team defeated Newark Academy 106-64 in the Non-Public B finals to earn the program's fifth consecutive title.

The cross country team won the Non-Public B state championship in 2018.

21st Century learning
Trinity Hall allows its students to be surrounded by 21st Century Learning. This means small class sizes in a technology-rich environment, 1:1 Programs, interactive boards, video communication, blended learning, an instructional approach that combines face-to-face classroom learning with computer-mediated activities, and more.

References

External links 
 

2013 establishments in New Jersey
Christian schools in New Jersey
Educational institutions established in 2013
Girls' schools in New Jersey
Private high schools in Monmouth County, New Jersey
Tinton Falls, New Jersey